Flinders Island spotted fever is a condition characterized by a rash in approximately 85% of cases.

It is associated with Rickettsia honei.

See also 
 Japanese spotted fever
 North Asian tick typhus
 List of cutaneous conditions
 Flinders Island

References

External links 

Bacterium-related cutaneous conditions
Rickettsioses